Nikola Eklemović (born 8 February 1978) is a Serbian-Hungarian former handball player.

Club career
Eklemović made his professional debut with Partizan and spent three seasons with the club (1993–1996). He also played for their arch-rivals Crvena zvezda for three years (1996–1999), before moving abroad. Later on, Eklemović spent over a decade in Hungary, switching two clubs: Pick Szeged (1999–2004) and MKB Veszprém (2004–2011). He subsequently moved to Poland and remained for three years with Wisła Płock (2011–2014). Before retiring from the game, Eklemović played for Romanian club Minaur Baia Mare in the 2014–15 season.

International career
Eklemović won the gold medal at the 1998 World University Championship. He also represented Serbia and Montenegro at the 2004 European Championship. Later on, Eklemović switched allegiance to Hungary, taking part in two European Championships (2008 and 2010) and one World Championship (2009).

Honours
Partizan
 Handball Championship of FR Yugoslavia: 1993–94, 1994–95
 Handball Cup of FR Yugoslavia: 1993–94
Crvena zvezda
 Handball Championship of FR Yugoslavia: 1996–97, 1997–98
MKB Veszprém
 Nemzeti Bajnokság I: 2004–05, 2005–06, 2007–08, 2008–09, 2009–10, 2010–11
 Magyar Kupa: 2004–05, 2006–07, 2008–09, 2009–10, 2010–11
 EHF Cup Winners' Cup: 2007–08
Minaur Baia Mare
 Liga Națională: 2014–15
 Cupa României: 2014–15

References

External links

 MKSZ record
 

1978 births
Living people
Handball players from Belgrade
Naturalized citizens of Hungary
Serbian male handball players
Hungarian male handball players
RK Partizan players
RK Crvena zvezda players
SC Pick Szeged players
Veszprém KC players
Expatriate handball players
Serbian expatriate sportspeople in Hungary
Serbian expatriate sportspeople in Poland
Serbian expatriate sportspeople in Romania